The National Supervisor Forum was founded in March 2001 to represent Supervisory Committees in Credit Unions in the Republic of Ireland and in Northern Ireland. One year later in March 2003, The NSF were granted official recognition by Dr. L. O'Reilly of the Irish Financial Services Regulatory Authority. The NSF is a non-governmental organisation.

AIMS of the NSF
 Supervisors will have a better understanding of the work required, their responsibilities and where their authority comes from.
 The NSF will be a source of advice for supervisors and give them an opportunity to enhance their skills.
 The NSF will be a forum for debate and informed discussion for the present and the future.
 The NSF will encourage supervisor development including potential supervisors.

Chairpersons
 2001-2006 Donal Murphy, Clonakilty Credit Union, County Cork
 2006-2011 Frank Nolan, Dundrum Credit Union, Dublin
 2011-2013 Margaret Worrell, Monasterevan Credit Union, County Kildare
 2014-2016 Joe Mulvey, St Joseph's Airports and Aviation Credit Union Dublin, Cork, Shannon
 2016-2017 Margaret McColgan, Derry Credit Union Derry City
 2017-2019 Liam Kelly, St Columba's Credit Union Galway City
 2019-   Deirdre Kelleher, Clonakilty Credit Union, County Cork

External links
 
 Facebook National Supervisor Forum
 Irish league of Credit Unions
 Central Bank Of Ireland
 Registrar of Credit Unions
 www.bankofengland.co.uk/pra/Pages/supervision/creditunions/default
 www.centralbank.ie/regulation/industry-sectors/credit-unions/Pages/Credit Union Handbook

Credit unions of Ireland
Credit unions of the United Kingdom